Thma Bay Kaek (Khmer: ប្រាសាទថ្មបាយក្អែក) is located at Angkor in Cambodia. It consists of the ruins of a square brick tower facing east and is preceded by a laterite terrace. This is all that remains of this temple which must be one of many that originally surrounded the Bakheng. 
A sacred treasure consisting of five gold leaves arranged in a quincunx, the central leaf of which carried the image of Nandi, was found here.

See also 
Baksei Chamkrong
Phnom Bakheng
Prasat Bei

References 

Angkorian sites in Siem Reap Province